DWAR (103.9 FM) RMN Palawan is an FM radio station owned by Romeo Servando's Rolin Broadcasting Enterprises and operated by the Radio Mindanao Network. Its main studio and transmitter are located along BM Rd., Bgy. San Manuel, Puerto Princesa, with repeaters located in various towns in Palawan.

Gerry Ortega, the pro-environment journalist slain last 2011, had a program in this station.

References

Radio stations in Puerto Princesa
News and talk radio stations in the Philippines